Vasil Slavov (Cyrillic: Васил Славов) is a Bulgarian author and poet, born on February 25, 1958, in Sofia, Bulgaria. He has been living in the United States since 1989. Graduated English philology from Sofia University " Kliment Ohridsky ". First collection of poetry published in 1989. Same year moved to USA. Studied poetry with the MFA program( Bruce Weigl ) at Pennsylvania State University. Author of several books of poetry and short stories. (editors of his books published in Bulgaria - Georgi Borissov, Boris Hristov, Penka Vatova, Rumen Leonidov). Awards in National Poetry Competitions:
"Binjo Ivanov" - 2013, 2015, 
"Christo Fotev" - 2016, 2018 (nomination), 
"Damjan Damjanov" - 2018.

References

1958 births
Living people
Bulgarian male poets